Michael Cia (born 3 August 1988) is an Italian footballer who plays as a midfielder for SSV Naturns.

Club career
A native of South Tyrol, Cia joined Atalanta in joint-ownership bid on 30 January 2007, he then loaned to Sambenedettese and Triestina.

Atalanta bought the player outright in June 2009. In July 2009, he was sold to city "rival" (in fact the club had many player transfer) AlbinoLeffe of Serie B along with Dario Bergamelli in another co-ownership deal in 5-year contract, as part of the deal that Nicola Madonna was re-signed by Atalanta in co-ownership deal for €550,000. Half of Cia was tagged for €400,000, while Bergamelli was for €150,000.

In June 2011 AlbinoLeffe bought Bergamelli, Cia and Karamoko Cissé outright from promoted Atalanta.

On 31 August 2011 Cia left for Benevento and Domenico Germinale moved to AlbinoLeffe also in temporary deal.

On 31 August 2012 he left for club again to Calcio Como along with Francesco Luoni. Circa 2012 Cia's contract was also extended. In June 2013 Como did not excise the option to sign Cia outright.

In 2013 Cia was signed by Pisa in temporary deal, with option to sign him in co-ownership.

International career
Cia has represented Italy at every youth level from Under-15 to Under-20. He played 3 times (one in third place match) in 2005 UEFA European Under-17 Football Championship and twice in 2005 FIFA U-17 World Championship.

On 25 March 2009 he made his debut with the Italy U-21 squad in a friendly match against Austria. That match was the fourth round of 2009–10 Four Nations Tournament. The tournament usually played by U-20 but Pierluigi Casiraghi used the match to prepare for the final round of 2009 U-21 Euro, selecting junior players (player born in 1988 or after) for that round (players born in 1986 or after were eligible).

References

External links

1988 births
Living people
Italian footballers
Italy under-21 international footballers
Italy youth international footballers
Association football midfielders
Sportspeople from Bolzano
Footballers from Trentino-Alto Adige/Südtirol
Atalanta B.C. players
A.S. Sambenedettese players
U.S. Triestina Calcio 1918 players
U.C. AlbinoLeffe players
Como 1907 players
Pisa S.C. players
F.C. Südtirol players
A.C. Delta Calcio Rovigo players
Serie B players
Serie C players
Eccellenza players
Promozione players